Roseburg School District (4) is a public school district in the U.S. state of Oregon that serves the communities of Roseburg and Winchester. The district enrolls close to 7,000 students.

Schools

Elementary schools
Eastwood Elementary 
Fir Grove Elementary
Fullerton IV Elementary
Green Elementary
Hucrest Elementary 
Melrose Elementary
Sunnyslope Elementary
Winchester Elementary

Middle schools
John C. Frémont Middle School
Joseph Lane Middle School

High school
Roseburg High School

External links
Roseburg Public Schools (official website)

School districts in Oregon
Roseburg, Oregon
Education in Douglas County, Oregon